The Saga Continues... is the second solo album recorded by funk musician Roger Troutman, released in 1984 on the Warner Bros. label. The album contains Troutman's cover of Wilson Pickett's "In the Midnight Hour", which reached #34 on the U.S. R&B chart, as well as hits "In the Mix" and "Girl Cut It Out", a duet with Wanda Rash. Like his previous solo offering, The Many Facets of Roger, Troutman and his band mates from Zapp, including brothers Lester, Larry and Terry, helped contribute to the album.

Track listing
All songs written by Roger and Larry Troutman except where noted.
"In the Mix" (6:22)
"Play Your Guitar, Brother Roger" (4:27)
"The Break Song" (5:50)
"I Keep Trying" (3:50) (Billy Beck)
"In the Midnight Hour" (6:58) (w/The Mighty Clouds of Joy) (Steve Cropper/Wilson Pickett)
"Bucket of Blood" (4:14)
"T.C. Song" (4:31)
"Girl, Cut It Out" (4:16) (w/Wanda Rash)

Personnel
Roger Troutman - guitars, talk box, vibraphone, keyboards, vocals, backing vocals
Ricardo Bray - guitars
Sherman Fleetwood - keyboards
Billy Beck, Greg Jackson - keyboards, backing vocals
Zapp Troutman - bass, keyboards, backing vocals
Lester Troutman - drums, percussion
Bart Thomas, Bobby Glover, Jannetta Boyce, Larry Hatcher, Mallia Franklin, Mark Thomas, Michael Jennings, Mighty Clouds of Joy, The, Ray Davis, Shelley Smith, Shirley Murdock, Tim Abrams, Varges Thomas, Wanda Rash - backing vocals
Carl Cowen, Jerome Derrickson, Larry Hatcher, Maceo Parker, Michael Jennings, Michael Warren - horns

References

External links

1984 albums
Roger Troutman albums
Reprise Records albums